Hilda Beatriz González de Duhalde, widely known as Chiche Duhalde, (born 14 October 1946) is an Argentine politician member of the Justicialist Party. She served as a Senator for Buenos Aires Province, and as the First Lady during the presidency of her husband, Eduardo Duhalde.

Biography
González de Duhalde was born in Lomas de Zamora, Buenos Aires Province, and studied to become a teacher. She has five children with her husband. She assisted her husband in his political career and took on several public positions in family and women's policy.

In 1997 Duhalde was elected a National Deputy for Buenos Aires Province, serving again between 2003 and 2005.

During the interim Presidency of her husband, she acted as Minister of Social Welfare and ran the country's food aid programme, a key role in the aftermath of the country's economic crisis. 

A member of the Justicialist Party (PJ), Duhalde has nevertheless opposed the government of fellow Peronists Néstor Kirchner. However the official PJ candidate in Buenos Aires Province district for the 2005 senatorial elections, Hilda Duhalde came second to Cristina Fernández de Kirchner, who was to become President of Argentina two years later.

External links
Senate profile
Website
Eduardo Duhalde's website, developed by Grupo de Apoyo Comunicacional Eduardo Duhalde (the Presidential candidate's communications team)

1946 births
Living people
People from Lomas de Zamora
Argentine people of Spanish descent
Members of the Argentine Senate for Buenos Aires Province
Members of the Argentine Chamber of Deputies elected in Buenos Aires Province
First ladies and gentlemen of Argentina
Justicialist Party politicians
Women members of the Argentine Senate
Women members of the Argentine Chamber of Deputies